This is a list of all cyclists who competed at the 2012 Summer Paralympics in London, United Kingdom.

2012 Paralympic cyclists

See also
List of cyclists at the 2012 Summer Olympics

References

cyclists
 
 
Lists of cyclists